Toni Kirén (born 18 June 1984) is a Finnish professional ice hockey player who played with Kärpät in the SM-liiga during the 2010–11 season.

Kirén previously played for Pelicans Lahti, Haukat, HeKi and HPK.

Career statistics

References

External links

1984 births
Asplöven HC players
Finnish ice hockey defencemen
Hokki players
HPK players
Kiekko-Laser players
KooKoo players
Oulun Kärpät players
Lahti Pelicans players
Living people
Peliitat Heinola players
Sportspeople from Lahti